Pentyne may refer to:

 2-Pentyne (ethyl methyl acetylene)
 1-Pentyne (propylacetylene)